Zumba Dance Fitness Party is an Indian Hindi dance fitness reality television series, which premiered on 2 April 2016 and is broadcast on Zoom. The series is a weekly series, airing on every Saturday. The series is a special six-episode series.

Presentation
The series is co-hosted by Pallavi Sharda. The series features celebrities like director-actress Divya Khosla Kumar, chef Ranveer Brar and singer Palak Muchhal.

References

2016 Indian television series debuts
Hindi-language television shows
Indian dance television shows
Indian reality television series
Television shows set in Mumbai
Zoom (Indian TV channel) original programming